Hubco Coal Power Project, also known as CPHGC Coal Power Project, is a coal power plant project located in Hub, Balochistan Pakistan.

History
It was established by the China Power Hub Generation Company (CPHGC) under the China-Pakistan Economic Corridor (CPEC).

It has an installed capacity of 1320 MW and commenced full operations on Aug 17, 2019.

References

China–Pakistan Economic Corridor
Coal-fired power stations in Pakistan
Energy in Balochistan, Pakistan